Bubby is a nickname which may refer to:

Bubby Brister (born 1962), American former National Football League quarterback
Bubby Dacer (1934–2000), publicist in the Philippines who was murdered
Bubby Jones (1941–2020), American race car driver and member of the National Sprint Car Hall of Fame
Bubby Gill (born 1984), American football player
Bubby Rossman (born 1992), American Major League Baseball pitcher

Bub or Bubby, one of the main characters in the Bubble Bobble video game series

English masculine given names
Lists of people by nickname